Daniel Hadad (born November 28, 1961) is an Argentine lawyer and businessman involved in telecommunications and media.

Biography
Daniel Hadad was born in Buenos Aires in 1961 into a family of Syrian origin. He earned degrees as a lawyer and journalist from the Catholic University of Argentina and completed post-graduate studies at the University of Navarra, in Spain. He was granted a scholarship by the Fundación Universidad Río de la Plata to continue his education in Washington DC.

Before he became a media businessman, Daniel Hadad worked as a journalist. He first earned renown in 1991 as the morning show co-host on Radio América, and later co-hosted Después de Hora (After Hours). He was also in charge of a radio talk show, El Primero de la Mañana (The First of the Morning). Following the privatization of most of the nation's airwaves by President Carlos Menem, Hadad launched Radio 10 (a ratings leader in the AM radio market), in 1998. He acquired a 50% stake in Channel 9, a leading Buenos Aires broadcaster in 2002 and purchased the remaining half. Hadad sold the network in December 2007 to Mexican investor Miguel Ángel González and acquired TV news channel C5N, which he sold in 2012 together with Pop Radio, Mega 98.3, FM Vale 97.5, Radio 10 and TKM Radio. He currently owns the online news daily Infobae.

External links and references

1961 births
Living people
Argentine people of Syrian descent
Lebanese Christians
People from Buenos Aires
Pontifical Catholic University of Argentina alumni
University of Navarra alumni
Argentine businesspeople
Argentine journalists
Male journalists
Argentine television personalities